The Federal Rural University of the Semi-arid Region, mostly known as UFERSA, in Brazil, was created on August 1, 2005, by Law No 11.155, which transformed the Superior School of Agronomy of Mossoró (ESAM) into a Federal University. ESAM was a municipal Higher Education Institution created on April 18, 1967, by Decree No 03/67 and incorporated to the federal educational system as a Governmental agency under special regime by Decree No 1036, on October 21, 1969. Nowadays, UFERSA has reached a 4 general index course (IGC), according to the Brazilian Ministry of Education.

Throughout Higher Education specific activities, UFERSA seeks to contribute to regional development by creating alternatives and solutions for local problems, especially those affecting people and Caatinga ecosystem.

Campuses and courses 
UFERSA occupies four campuses in four cities. The main campus is located in Mossoró. Also, there are campuses in the cities of Caraúbas, Pau dos Ferros and Angicos. In the four campuses, it offers undergraduate and graduate programs, covering more than eight knowledge areas. The East campus has around 1400 employees including administrative staff and professors. The west campus has 1073 employees in total.

Undergraduate programs

Clinical, Preclinical & Health: Medical Science

Arts & Humanities: Architecture and Urban Planning; Brazilian Sign Language; English Language; Portuguese Language.

Engineering & Technology: Chemical Engineering; Civil Engineering; Electrical Engineering; Information Systems; Information Technology; Mechanical Engineering; Petroleum Engineering; Production Engineering; Sanitary and Environmental Engineering; Science and Technology.

Computer Science: Computer Engineering; Computer Science; Software Engineering.

Life Sciences: Agricultural and Environment Engineering; Agronomy; Animal Science; Biotechnology; Ecology; Fisheries Engineering; Forest Engineering; Veterinary.

Business & Economics: Accounting; Administration.

Law: Law

Education: Agricultural Education; Computational and Informatics Education; Pedagogy.

Graduate Programs:

Master or Doctorate degree: Animal Science; Plant Science; Soil and Water Management.

Master's degree: Animal production; Cognition, Technologies and Institutions; Communication and Automation Systems; Computer Science; Ecology and Conservation; Environment, Technology and Society; Teaching; Professional Master in Mathematics; Professional Master in Physics; Professional Master in Public Administration.

Residence degree: Veterinary Medicine.

International agreements 
As a reflection of its internationalization policy, UFERSA has international cooperation agreements with the following institutions:

 University of Miyazaki, Japão (2018 – 2023)
 Instituto Superior de Agronomia de Lisboa, Portugal (2013 – 2019)
 Università degli Studi di Torino, Itália (2015 – 2020)
 Universitat de València, Espanha (2015 – 2020)
 Universidad Nacional de Santiago del Estero, Argentina (2016 – 2021)
 ECAM-EPMI, França (2017 – 2022)
 Universidad de Buenos Aires, Argentina (2017 – 2022)
 Universidad Católica de Córdoba, Argentina (2018 – 2023)

References

External links 

  
 Official website 

Educational institutions established in 2005
Rio Grande do Norte
Education in Rio Grande do Norte
2005 establishments in Brazil